Lympstone Village railway station serves the village of Lympstone in Devon, England.

History
Lympstone station was opened with the railway on 1 May 1861.  It was renamed Lympstone Village in the 1990s to avoid confusion with the new Lympstone Commando railway station that had opened on 3 May 1976.

Following the privatisation of British Rail it was operated by Wales & West, latterly Wessex Trains, until 31 March 2006 when the franchise was taken over by First Great Western.

Description and facilities 
The station is situated on an embankment, with a single platform; a disused second platform is now heavily overgrown. To the south the line crosses the village on a low viaduct.

It is unstaffed and tickets cannot be purchased at the station. There are stands for bicycle parking and a 20-space car park.

Services

References

External links

Railway stations in Devon
Railway stations in Great Britain opened in 1861
Former London and South Western Railway stations
Railway stations served by Great Western Railway
1861 establishments in England
DfT Category F2 stations